Alteon may refer to:
Alteon Inc., initial developers of Alagebrium
Alteon Training, an aircraft training school owned by The Boeing Company
Alteon WebSystems, a network products manufacturer